Barnes  may refer to:

People
Barnes (name), a family name and a given name (includes lists of people with that name)

Places

United Kingdom
Barnes, London, England
Barnes railway station
Barnes Bridge railway station
Barnes Railway Bridge
 Barnes Hospital, London
Municipal Borough of Barnes (1894 to 1965)
 Barnes, Sunderland, England
Barnes Castle, East Lothian, Scotland
Barnes Hall, Sheffield

United States
Barnes, Kansas
Barnes County, North Dakota
Barnes Creek (Washington), a stream in the State of Washington
Barnes Creek (Wisconsin), a stream in Wisconsin
Barnes Lake (disambiguation)

Elsewhere
Barnes, New South Wales, Australia
Barnes Ice Cap, on Baffin Island,  Canada

Other uses
Barnes Foundation, art museum in Philadelphia, Pennsylvania, USA
Barnes Group, a global industrial and aerospace manufacturer
Barnes Hospital, Cheadle, Greater Manchester, England
Barnes–Hut simulation of gravitational forces
Barnes-Jewish Hospital, in St. Louis, Missouri, USA
Barnes Municipal Airport, in Westfield, Massachusetts, USA
Barnes Opening, an opening in chess
Barnes Rugby Football Club, a rugby union club in London
Barnes School, Devlali, India
USS Barnes, several warships

See also
Barn
Barne
 Justice Barnes (disambiguation)